Iran Aseman Airlines is the third-largest Iranian airline headquartered in Tehran. It operates scheduled domestic passenger services and regional international services.

History 
The airline was established and started operating in 1980. The airline's historic links go back to 1958 to the airline Air Taxi Co., which was rebranded as Pars Air in the 1970s and later Iran Aseman Airlines. In March 2007, it was owned by Iranian Civil Pension Fund Investment Company and had 298 employees. It has since been privatized.

In July 2016, the CEO of the airline was issued an arrest warrant because of an alleged sum of approximately $37 million in public debts to Iran Airports & Air Navigation Company.

In February 2017, it emerged that Aseman Airlines was in talks with an Irish firm to lease seven Airbus A320neos.
In April 2017, the airline signed a Memorandum of Agreement with Boeing for the purchase of 30 Boeing 737 MAX aircraft with options for another 30 aircraft. In June 2017, Iran Aseman Airlines signed a final deal to buy 30 Boeing 737 MAX jets. In June 2018, Boeing announced it would not be able to deliver any aircraft to Iranian airlines due to the US's sanctions against Iran.

On 13 January 2019, the airline operated the last Boeing 727 commercial passenger flight worldwide.

The airline is currently banned from operating in the airspace of the European Union for "failing to meet [safety-related] regulatory oversight standards of the EU".

Destinations

Fleet

Current fleet
As of August 2019, Iran Aseman Airlines operated the following fleet:

Former fleet

Accidents and incidents 
On 4 October 1990, an Iran Aseman Fokker F27 Friendship (registration EP-ANA) overran the runway upon landing at Ramsar Airport, and came to rest at a concrete wall 100 metres behind the runway. There were no fatalities amongst the 46 passengers and four crew members on board, and the aircraft was fully repaired.
On 12 October 1994, Iran Aseman Airlines Flight 746, a Fokker F28 Fellowship (registration EP-PAV) en route from Isfahan to Tehran suffered a sudden loss of power in both engines at 23:05 local time, 35 minutes after take-off from Isfahan International Airport. The aircraft spiralled into an uncontrolled descent and crashed near Natanz, killing all 59 passengers and seven crew members on board.
On 18 July 2000, Iran Aseman Airlines Flight 775, a Fokker F28 Fellowship (registration EP-PAU) en route from Tehran to Ahvaz, was damaged beyond repair when the pilot missed the runway upon a low-visibility landing attempt at Ahvaz Airport and instead touched down next to it. A successful go-around was executed, and there were no injuries amongst the 84 passengers and four crew members on board.
On 26 August 2010, a Fokker 100 (registration EP-ASL) operating Iran Aseman Airlines Flight 773 from Tehran to Tabriz overran the runway upon landing at Tabriz International Airport and was substantially damaged when it plunged into a canal. Two out of the 103 passengers on board were injured, while none of the seven crew members were hurt.
 On 10 May 2014, a Fokker 100 (registration EP-ASZ), was damaged in a landing accident at Zahedan Airport (ZAH), Iran. The airplane operated Flight 853 from Mashhad Airport (MHD). According to local media the left hand main undercarriage failed to extend or lock prior to landing. A forced landing was carried out on runway 35. The airplane swerved to the left and came to rest 1450 meters (4760 feet) past the runway 35 threshold and 23 meters (75 feet) to the left of the centreline.
 On 18 February 2018, Iran Aseman Airlines Flight 3704, an ATR 72-200 (registration EP-ATS) flying from Tehran to Yasuj, crashed into the Zagros Mountains, south of Isfahan after it disappeared from radar, 50 minutes after taking off from Mehrabad Airport. All 66 people (60 passengers and six crew) were killed.

Logo and Livery 
The logo of Aseman Airlines is navy blue and is inspired by a flying Crane (Dorna).

In August 2014, Iran Aseman Airlines made changes in the combination of the logo and livery to the current version. The design was prepared by a designer from Mashhad named Saeed Khosrovan and after a short period of time it was implemented on the fleet of Iran Aseman Airlines.

See also
 List of airlines of Iran

References

External links 

 
  Iran Aseman Airlines Ebooking website
 Iran Aseman Airlines Mashhad base website
  Iran Aseman Airlines Mashhad base website
 Iran Aseman Airlines Shiraz base website
  Iran Aseman Airlines Shiraz base website
 Iran Aseman Airlines fleet list
 Search Results - MyAviation.ir Iran Aviation Photography Gallery Iran Aseman Airlines photos]

Airlines banned in the European Union
Airlines of Iran
Airlines established in 1980
Iranian companies established in 1980